A-Mark Precious Metals (founded in 1965 as A Mark Coin Company) is a precious metals trading company. A-Mark is traded on Nasdaq and is a Fortune 500 company as of 2021.

History
Greg Manning Auctions Inc. bought a majority stake in A-Mark for $16 million in 2005. Thereafter, the firm changed its name to Escala Group, then to Spectrum Group International Inc. In 2009, it purchased the remainder of A-Mark. In 2014, Spectrum spun off A-Mark so that it could be publicly traded. A-Mark acquired Goldline International in 2017.

Corporate affairs

Shareholder structure 
As of 2021, A-Mark stock is in held by institutional investors (43%), the general public (29%) and private companies (7%). Individual insiders hold about 21%.

Financial results 
Following its initial public offering A-Mark has grown its revenue from US$5.9 billion in 2015 to US7.6 billion in 2021. The following list is an overview of the main financial results from recent years:

References

External links 
 Official website

Metal companies of the United States
American companies established in 1965
Manufacturing companies established in 1965
1965 establishments in California
Companies based in El Segundo, California